(born December 24, 1958 in Iizuka, Fukuoka, Japan) is a Japanese actress. She won the award for Best Actress at the 6th Yokohama Film Festival for Mermaid Legend.

Filmography
Mermaid Legend (1984)

References

External links
 
 

1958 births
Japanese actresses
Living people
Actors from Fukuoka Prefecture
People from Iizuka, Fukuoka